Jonathan Kevin Hendrickx (born 25 December 1993) is a Belgian professional footballer who plays as a right back for URSL Visé.

Club career
On 1 February 2021, after a year-and-a-half in Belgium, Hendrickx moved to Iceland for a third time, joining Úrvalsdeild side KA Akureyri.

Personal life
Jonathan is the older brother of fellow professional footballer Gaëtan Hendrickx.

References

External links
 Voetbal International profile 
 

1993 births
Footballers from Liège
Living people
Belgian footballers
Association football defenders
Fortuna Sittard players
Fimleikafélag Hafnarfjarðar players
Leixões S.C. players
Jonathan Hendrickx
Lommel S.K. players
Knattspyrnufélag Akureyrar players
Lierse Kempenzonen players
Eerste Divisie players
Liga Portugal 2 players
Jonathan Hendrickx
Challenger Pro League players
Belgian expatriate footballers
Expatriate footballers in the Netherlands
Belgian expatriate sportspeople in the Netherlands
Expatriate footballers in Iceland
Belgian expatriate sportspeople in Iceland
Expatriate footballers in Portugal
Belgian expatriate sportspeople in Portugal